Walloon may refer to:

 Walloons, a French-speaking population of Belgium
 Walloon language 
 Walloon Region or Wallonia in Belgium
 Walloon Government
 Walloon Lake
 Walloon, Queensland

See also
 The Walloons, a 1782 play by Richard Cumberland
 Walloon sword
 Wallon (disambiguation)

Language and nationality disambiguation pages